William Goldberg (March 19, 1925 – October 20, 2003) was an American diamond dealer and the founder of the William Goldberg Diamond Corporation.

Goldberg was born in Brooklyn, New York City. He started cutting diamonds in 1948, but found that his aptitude lay with buying and selling diamonds rather than cutting them. In 1952 he founded Goldberg & Weiss with diamond cutter Irving Weiss. In 1973 he formed the William Goldberg Diamond Corporation, located on 48th Street in New York City's Diamond District. In 1978 he became president of the New York Diamond Dealers Club and served three terms. He traded well known diamonds including the Queen of Holland diamond, the Premier Rose diamond, the Red Shield diamond and the Pumpkin diamond.

He died of pancreatic cancer, aged 77. Following his death, members of Goldberg's family created the William Goldberg Endowed Scholarship Fund at the Gemological Institute of America.

References

1925 births
2003 deaths
Diamond dealers
People from Brooklyn